Alcora may refer to:

L'Alcora, a municipality in the Valencian Community, Spain
Alcora Exercise, cooperation between Portugal, South Africa and Rhodesia in the early 1970s